Julien-Léopold Boilly (1796–1874), also known as Jules Boilly, was a French artist noted for his album of lithographs Iconographie de l'Institut Royal de France (1820–1821) and his booklet Album de 73 portraits-charge aquarellés des membres de l’Institut (1820) containing watercolor caricatures of seventy-three famous mathematicians, in particular the French mathematician Adrien-Marie Legendre, the only known portrait of him.

Born in Paris on 30 August 1796, he was a son of the genial painter-engraver Louis-Léopold Boilly. Admitted to the lycée at Versailles  15 December 1806, he painted portraits and illustrated books with lithographs. He also collected autographs. He died on 14 June 1874.

References

External links 

1796 births
1874 deaths
19th-century French painters
French draughtsmen
French male painters
French portrait painters
French watercolourists
Painters from Paris
19th-century French male artists
18th-century French male artists